Mary Boyle (born 14 June 1970) was a six-year-old Irish girl who disappeared on the County Donegal-County Fermanagh border on 18 March 1977. To date, her disappearance is the longest missing child case in the Republic of Ireland. The investigation into her disappearance has been beset by allegations of political intervention and police incompetence.

Disappearance
Mary Boyle was last seen at 3:30 pm on 18 March 1977 near her grandparents' rural farm in Cashelard, near Ballyshannon, County Donegal. The family, including Mary's mother Ann, father Charlie, older brother Paddy, and twin sister Ann, had gone to Mary's maternal grandparents' house on St Patrick's Day from their home in Kincasslagh in The Rosses, further up the coast. Mary followed her uncle until they reached a small pool of water that was too deep for her to get through. Whether by her own decision or by her uncle's instruction, Mary turned around halfway into the journey saying she was going back. Her return journey should not have lasted longer than five minutes, whilst her uncle stayed at the neighbours for thirty minutes for a chat. 

After discovering that Mary had disappeared, her family instituted searches of the local area and questioned passers-by if they had seen the girl. One fisherman was quoted as saying that he had seen Mary being put into a red car and then driven away, although he later corrected this in a BBC podcast by saying he had not actually seen Mary, but just a suspicious red car.  Many of the bogs in the area were drained and scoured in an effort to find the girl. Mary's twin sister, Ann, had stated that she was eating a packet of crisps at the time of her disappearance and if she had fallen into a bog, the packet would have floated on the surface.

Investigations
The Gardaí started a search of the surrounding area and drained a lake behind her grandparents' house. They also created a filmed reconstruction of the disappearance in which Ann Boyle was used as a stand-in for her twin sister. 

In 2008, the Irish public broadcaster, RTÉ, broadcast a documentary programme about the case called Cracking Crime. Over the intervening years, the performer Margo O'Donnell, a friend of and relation to the family, has funded searches on the surrounding hillsides in an effort to try and locate Mary's body. Police searches have also taken place since 1977, with the latest taking place in 2016 when the Garda Síochána launched a new investigation. However, no evidence has been found.

The case has attracted some publicity because of allegations of political interference which centred around the accusation that a politician phoned the Gardaí and told them to not question or detain their main suspect. O'Donnell was said to have walked up to the politician who was accused of making the call in 1977 and asked if he had done so. According to O'Donnell, he said "[that it] was untrue and called me a bare-faced liar." The length of time that Boyle has been missing, and allegations of official involvement, led The Guardian to label the case "Ireland's Madeleine McCann". The case is now the longest-running missing child case in modern Irish history, and despite the publicity it attracts, it has not been debated in the Dáil. It was raised by Lynn Boylan MEP in the European Parliament, where she highlighted the lack of direction in the case.

In 2018, relatives and supporters held a silent protest outside the coroner's office in Stranorlar. The protest was intended to force the coroner to hold an inquest into Mary's death which would allow key witnesses to be interviewed on public record for the first time. Boyle's twin sister Ann was among the group, which handed in a petition containing more than 10,000 signatures demanding that an inquest be held.

In 2016, the controversial Irish investigative journalist Gemma O'Doherty, produced a documentary about the disappearance titled Mary Boyle: The Untold Story, which explores several possible causes for her disappearance. In the documentary, Mary's sister Ann posits that Mary was sexually abused and then murdered. The film has come under some criticism by the people interviewed for the programme. Both the retired Garda sergeants who talked on screen deny that any political pressure was brought to bear on their investigation; one interviewing officer said he was told to "ease off" when questioning one of the suspects in the case, but this was by a senior officer in the room at the time of the suspect's interview. The film led to O'Doherty being sued for defamation by Fianna Fáil politician Sean McEniff for damages of €75,000, although McEniff was never mentioned by name in the film. In 2019, after McEniff's death, a judge granted his estate leave to continue the case.

In March 2018, Gardaí issued a request for information regarding the case and stated that the investigation was still live.

Suspects
The initial suspect, questioned soon after Boyle disappeared, was released without charge. Other people have been questioned in relation to the disappearance; Brian McMahon was taken in for questioning by Gardaí in October 2014 but was released without charge the following day. McMahon later went on public record denying any involvement in the disappearance and stating that local people knew he could not have been involved. 

Robert Black, a convicted serial killer of children, was also proposed as a suspect when it was revealed that he was a cross-border truck driver who often visited County Donegal as part of his job and could have been in the area at the time of Boyle's disappearance. Black was known in the area and had been charged by the Garda for after-hours drinking. His van was identified outside a pub in Annagry, County Donegal, at the time of Boyle's disappearance. A witness later claimed that they had heard crying and whimpering from the rear of the van. However, by the time of O'Doherty's documentary going online, it was widely believed that Black could not have been responsible.

Mary's twin sister Ann Boyle and several other relatives publicly claim they believe they know what happened to Mary and who is responsible for her disappearance. This has caused tension and a division within the Boyle family, with Ann's mother (also named Ann) publicly admonishing her daughter in 2016; calling her public appeals "...the most ridiculous carry on I ever seen in my life."

Aftermath
Boyle's father Charlie died in a fishing accident off the coast of Donegal in 2005. In 2011, O'Donnell released the single "The Missing Mary Boyle" to raise funds for a new search for the missing girl. Due, in part, to the younger Ann Boyle's public accusations, the Boyle family remain divided.

See also
 List of people who disappeared

Further reading

References

External links
No Body Recovered (BBC podcast series)

1970s missing person cases
March 1977 events in Europe
Missing Irish children
Missing person cases in Ireland
Irish twins
Ballyshannon